Eero-Matti Auvinen (born 5 March 1996) is a Finnish professional footballer who plays for FC Haka, as a centre-back.

References

1996 births
Living people
Finnish footballers
FC Hämeenlinna players
FC Haka players
AC Oulu players
Vaasan Palloseura players
Veikkausliiga players
Ykkönen players
Kakkonen players
Association football defenders
HIFK Fotboll players